The Léngqié Shīzī Jì (楞伽師資記) (Record of the Masters and Disciples of the Laṅkāvatāra Sūtra) is a lineage history of Chan Buddhism, attributed to Jìngjué (淨覺) (683 C.E. - 750 C.E.). 

A Classical Tibetan translation is held at the British Library, IOL Tib J 710/2.

References 

Chan Buddhism
Zen texts
Buddhist commentaries
Chinese Buddhist texts
Tang dynasty literature